Joseph C. Gambone is an osteopathic physician, clinical professor at Western University of Health Sciences, and emeritus professor of obstetrics and gynecology at University of California, Los Angeles (UCLA). Gambone is the Executive Editor of the textbook Essentials of Obstetrics and Gynecology. He currently practices reproductive endocrinology and infertility in Durango, Colorado. A former Lieutenant in the US Navy, Gambone Peak in Antarctica was named in his honor.

Background and education
Joseph C. Gambone graduated from LaSalle College with a Bachelor of Arts in Psychology/Biology in 1966. In the late 1960s, he worked as an officer in the US Navy, at the rank of Lieutenant.  For his work in the Navy, Gambone Peak in Antarctica was named in his honor.

He graduated from the Philadelphia College of Osteopathic Medicine in 1974. He completed a 1 year internship at Naval Hospital in San Diego. He completed a residency in obstetrics and gynecology at UCLA Medical Center in 1979.  In 1981, he completed a fellowship in reproductive endocrinology and infertility at UCLA Medical Center.

In 1992, he completed a Master of Business Administration at the UCLA Anderson School of Management. In 1999, he completed a Masters in Public Health (MPH) degree at UCLA School of Public Health.

Publications

References

Living people
American osteopathic physicians
LaSalle College alumni
Year of birth missing (living people)
David Geffen School of Medicine at UCLA faculty
UCLA Anderson School of Management alumni
UCLA School of Public Health alumni
United States Navy Medical Corps officers
20th-century surgeons
21st-century surgeons
21st-century American physicians
20th-century American physicians
Philadelphia College of Osteopathic Medicine alumni